Phosphoenolpyruvic carboxylase may refer to:
 Phosphoenolpyruvate carboxykinase (diphosphate), an enzyme
 Phosphoenolpyruvate carboxykinase (ATP), an enzyme